Berville-en-Caux (literally Berville in Caux; before 2017: Berville) is a commune in the Seine-Maritime department in the Normandy region in north-western France.

Geography

Population

Places of interest
 The church of Saint-Wandrille, dating from the nineteenth century.
 The eighteenth century chapel of Saint-Gilles.

See also
Communes of the Seine-Maritime department

References

Communes of Seine-Maritime